Nariman Khalid Muhammad Abdulhafiz Aly (born 29 September 1998) is an Egyptian synchronised swimmer. She competed in the team event at the 2016 Summer Olympics.

References

External links
 

1998 births
Living people
Egyptian synchronized swimmers
Olympic synchronized swimmers of Egypt
Synchronized swimmers at the 2016 Summer Olympics